Tadiwanashe Nyangani (born 12 March 2002) is a Zimbabwean cricketer. He made his first-class debut on 24 March 2021, for Eagles, in the 2020–21 Logan Cup. Prior to his first-class debut, he was named in Zimbabwe's squad for the 2020 Under-19 Cricket World Cup. He made his List A debut on 18 April 2021, for Eagles, in the 2020–21 Pro50 Championship.

References

External links
 

2002 births
Living people
Zimbabwean cricketers
Mashonaland Eagles cricketers
Place of birth missing (living people)